Yumurtalık Lagoon is a lagoon located in Adana Province, southern Turkey. The area is a nature reserve, a national park, and is a Ramsar site.

References

Landforms of Adana Province
Lagoons of Turkey
Yumurtalık
National parks of Turkey
Nature reserves in Turkey
Ramsar sites in Turkey
Protected areas established in 2005
2005 establishments in Turkey
Important Bird Areas of Turkey